Pizza Brain is an American pizza culture museum and pizzeria, home to the world's largest collection of pizza memorabilia and collectibles. Pizza Brain is currently headquartered in the Kensington neighborhood of Philadelphia, United States, with the flagship restaurant on Frankford Avenue.

History
In May 2010, Kensington-based artist, Brian Dwyer, along with Christopher Powell, organized "Give Pizza Chance"—Philadelphia's first pizza-based art show—in which pizza served as muse for more than 25 artists who displayed their work at a local gallery.

In October 2010, Dwyer met Carter at Circle of Hope's annual mapping meeting.  Dwyer shared his enthusiasm for collecting pizza-related objects with Carter. Carter's extensive business travels and love of art immediately led him to the idea of presenting the items in a museum format. In late Fall 2010, Joe Hunter, a pizza chef hailing from South Carolina interested in opening a community-minded pizzeria in his adopted home of Philadelphia, joined Carter and Dwyer. By January 2011, master carpenter Ryan Anderson had teamed up with Brian, Michael and Joe to identify a pair of buildings in the Fishtown section of Philadelphia in which to locate their project. Hunter started working on Pizza Brain’s pizzas and flavor profiles. Carter provided curatorial direction to Dwyer’s collection and developed the business’ strategic model, including its emphasis on content-rich social media.  Anderson applied his carpentry talents to the design of Pizza Brain’s physical space, making use of reclaimed and found materials. Dwyer and Carter continued to source pizza-related items to place on the company's Facebook, Tumblr and Instagram accounts. Collaboratively, the quartet turned an art show into the Pizza Brain museum and restaurant concept: a place that serves artisan pies in a museum-like space that captures and commemorates pizza as a cultural icon.

Together they curated the world's largest collection of pizza related items, earning a Guinness World Record in summer 2011.

On September 7, 2012, Pizza Brain opened its doors to the public. (The company's name comes from the frequent misspelling of Dwyer's first name, in which the 'a' and the 'i' are transposed to spell 'Brain.').

Guinness World Record
In preparation for the opening of Pizza Brain, Carter and Dwyer submitted their collection to be adjudicated by Guinness World Record. On July 31, 2011, Guinness World Records certified the collection releasing certificates under both Pizza Brain's and Dwyer's name as "the world's largest collection of pizza-related items"; they cited 561 different items, from all over the world, collected since 2010.

Pre-open press
A number of additional articles followed the creation of the Museum of Pizza Culture as it gained notoriety, including articles from Zagat, The Huffington Post, The Philadelphia Inquirer, Fox News, Food Network Magazine,
Metro, Laughing Squid, and the magazine for Australia's national airline Qantas.   

NPR's All Things Considered also covered the story, as well as TV outlets like NBC 10, and Good Morning Sacramento.

In September 2012, The New York Times, Associated Press, Condé Nast Traveler, USA Today, TIME, BBC Travel  and The Guardian all profiled Pizza Brain during its opening month, garnering further national and international attention.

On September 26, 2012, CBS This Morning  aired a nationally televised news feature on the museum/restaurant, resulting in Pizza Brain being selected as a topic of discussion on Jeopardy!s Twitter account.

Pizza awards & accolades post open
Pizza Brain earned its first foodie award before it opened. Though he is not a pizza maker, the Guinness record and enthusiasm for its grand opening led to partner Dwyer being the honorific title of "Phoodie of the Year" from Philebrity.com, closely beating out candidates ?uestlove, Iron Chef America star, Michael Solomonov, Philadelphia food writer and Green Aisle Grocery owner Adam Erace, and Tom McCusker aka 'Honest Tom' of Honest Tom's Tacos.

Post-opening, under the direction of head chef Joe Hunter, Pizza Brain has established itself as one of Philadelphia's best pizza shops, including earning 3 "Best of Philly" Awards  from Philadelphia Magazine  It has received local, national and international recognition, for its creative pizza pies.

Notable awards, reviews and lists include: 
3 Philadelphia Magazine "Best of Philly" awards
Business Insider's Best Pizza in Every State, 
Zagat's 10 Killer Slices of Pizza in Philly
Nylon Magazine's 15 Best Pizza Slices in America, 
The Daily Meals 10 Best Pepperoni Pizzas In America 
Food Network's 50 Top Pizza Deliveries from Coast to Coast.
The Daily Meal'''s 101 Best Pizzas in America for 2017 The Daily Meals 101 Best Pizzas in America for 2018  andThe Daily Meal's The 101 Best Pizzas in America 2019  andThe Infatuation's The Best Pizza Places In Philadelphia 

Notable national exposure since opening include: ABC's The Chew, Travel Channel's Food Paradise, The Cooking Channel's Pizza Cuz.

Notable international press: Argentina's Resto Del Mundo, Brasil's O Mundo Segundo Los Brasileiros and Uruguay's Plan de Vuelo''

See also
 List of pizza chains of the United States

References

External links

 

Privately held companies based in Pennsylvania
Companies based in Philadelphia
American companies established in 2011
Food museums in the United States
Pizzerias in the United States
Restaurants in Philadelphia
Museums established in 2012
2011 establishments in Pennsylvania